João Alberto Lins de Barros was a Brazilian politician in the early 20th century. He was appointed by Getúlio Vargas provisional governor in place of the elected governor of São Paulo. Elite paulistas loathed Alberto, resenting his centralization efforts and alarmed by his economic reforms, such as a mere 5% wage increase and some minor distribution of some land to participants in the revolution. Amid threats of revolt, Vargas replaced João Alberto with a civilian from São Paulo, appointed a conservative paulista banker as his minister of finance, and announced a date for the holding of a constituent assembly. The coffee oligarchs were only emboldened, launching the counterrevolutionary revolt in July 1932, which collapsed after some minor, lackadaisical combat.

1897 births
1955 deaths
Governors of São Paulo (state)
People from Olinda